Pethia khugae is a species of cyprinid fish native to India where it is found in the Chindwin River basin, occurring in clear, relatively fast-flowing streams.  This species reaches a length of  SL.

References

Pethia
Fish described in 2007
Barbs (fish)